Grouvellinus leonardodicaprioi is a species of riffle beetle in the superfamily Byrrhoidea. The beetle was discovered by citizen scientists working with a group of scientists from Taxon Expeditions. G. leonardodicaprioi belongs to the family Elmidae, and it is endemic to Malaysia.

Etymology
The species was named after actor and environmentalist Leonardo DiCaprio to acknowledge his work in "promoting environmental awareness and bringing the problems of climate change and biodiversity loss into the spotlight". The species description received media coverage by news outlets such as The Guardian, USA Today, and Forbes due to its name.

See also
List of organisms named after famous people (born 1950–present)
 Spintharus leonardodicaprioi, a spider named after DiCaprio

References 

Beetles described in 2018
Elmidae
Insects of Borneo
Leonardo DiCaprio